Antônio Abujamra (15 September 1932 – 28 April 2015) was a Brazilian theatre and television director and actor. Having majored in journalism and philosophy at the Pontifícia Universidade Católica do Rio Grande do Sul in 1957, he started a career as a theatre critic while he directed and acted in his own plays at the university theatre. Professionally, he made his debut as a theatre director in 1961, and as an actor in 1987, acting in both theatre and television. In 1989, he gained national fame for his role as Ravengar in Rede Globo's telenovela Que Rei Sou Eu?, which became his best known role. In that same year, Abujamra won the Best Actor award at the Gramado Film Festival for his role in the film Festa. From 2000 onward, he was the presenter on TV Cultura's interview program Provocações. His son André Abujamra is a score composer, while his niece Clarisse Abujamra, is also an actress.

Filmography

References

External links

1932 births
2015 deaths
People from Ourinhos
20th-century Brazilian male actors
21st-century Brazilian male actors
Brazilian male film actors
Brazilian male stage actors
Brazilian male television actors
Brazilian people of Lebanese descent
Brazilian television presenters
Brazilian theatre directors
Pontifical Catholic University of Rio Grande do Sul alumni